Cyril Evans  may refer to:

Cyril Edward Evans (1896–1975), New Zealand cricketer and rugby player
Cyril Furmstone Evans (1892–1959), wireless telegraphist, associated with the RMS Titanic